Vasily Kozlov may refer to:

 Vasily Kozlov (sculptor) (1887–1940), Soviet sculptor
 Vasily Kozlov (politician) (1903–1967), Soviet politician